Nalhati–Azimganj branch line is a railway line connecting Nalhati Junction and Azimganj Junction.

History
In 1863, the Indian Branch Railway Company, a private company opened the Nalhati–Azimganj branch line. The 27 kilometres (17 mi) track was initially a 4' gauge line. The track was subsequently converted to 5' 6" broad gauge. The Indian Branch Railway Company was purchased by the Government of India in 1872 and the line was renamed Nalhati State Railway. It became a part of the East Indian Railway Company in 1892.

Doubling and Electrification
Starting from Nalhati Junction to Azimganj (AZ) line doubling and electrification project has been completed.

References 

5 ft 6 in gauge railways in India
Rail transport in West Bengal
1863 establishments in India